Impression formation in social psychology refers to the processes by which different pieces of knowledge about another are combined into a global or summary impression. Social psychologist Solomon Asch is credited with the seminal research on impression formation and conducted research on how individuals integrate information about personality traits. Two major theories have been proposed to explain how this process of integration takes place. The Gestalt approach views the formation of a general impression as the sum of several interrelated impressions. As an individual seeks to form a coherent and meaningful impression of another individual, previous impressions significantly influence the interpretation of subsequent information. In contrast to the Gestalt approach, the cognitive algebra approach asserts that individuals' experiences are combined with previous evaluations to form a constantly changing impression of a person. A related area to impression formation is the study of person perception, making dispositional attributions, and then adjusting those inferences based on the information available.

Methods
Impression formation has traditionally been studied using three methods pioneered by Asch: free response, free association, and a check-list form. In addition, a fourth method based on a Likert scale with anchors such as “very favorable” and “very unfavorable”, has also been used in recent research. A combination of some or all of these techniques is often employed to produce the most accurate assessment of impression formation.

Free response
Free response is an experimental method frequently used in impression formation research. The participant (or perceiver) is presented with a stimulus (usually a short vignette or a list of personality descriptors such as assured, talkative, cold, etc.) and then instructed to briefly sketch his or her impressions of the type of person described. This is a useful technique for gathering detailed and concrete evidence on the nature of the impression formed. However, the difficulty of accurately coding responses often necessitates the use of additional quantitative measures.

Free association

Free association is another commonly used experimental method in which the perceiver creates a list of personality adjectives that immediately come to mind when asked to think about the type of person described by a particular set of descriptor adjectives.

Check-list
A check-list consisting of assorted personality descriptors is often used to supplement free response or free association data and to compare group trends. After presenting character-qualities of an imagined individual, perceivers are instructed to select the character adjectives from a preset list that best describe the resulting impression. While this produces an easily quantifiable assessment of an impression, it forces participants' answers into a limited, and often extreme, response set. However, when used in conjunction with the above-mentioned techniques, check-list data provides useful information about the character of impressions.

Likert-type rating scales
With Likert scales, perceivers are responding to a presentation of discrete personality characteristics. Common presentation methods include lists of adjectives, photos or videos depicting a scene, or written scenarios. For example, a participant might be asked to answer the question "Would an honest (trait) person ever search for the owner of a lost package (behavior)?" by answering on a 5-point scale ranging from 1 "very unlikely" to 5 "very likely."

Specific results

Primacy-recency effect
Asch stressed the important influence of an individual's initial impressions of a person's personality traits on the interpretation of all subsequent impressions. Asch argued that these early impressions often shaped or colored an individual's perception of other trait-related details. A considerable body of research exists supporting this hypothesis. For example, when individuals were asked to rate their impression of another person after being presented a list of words progressing from either low favorability to high favorability (L - H) or from high favorability to low favorability (H - L), strong primacy effects were found. In other words, impressions formed from initial descriptor adjectives persisted over time and influenced global impressions. In general, primacy can have three main effects: initial trait-information can be integrated into an individual's global impression of a person in a process of assimilation effects, it can lead to a durable impression against which other information is compared in a process of anchoring, and it can cause people to actively change their perception of others in a process of correction.

Valence
The emotionality of certain personality traits, such as "warm" versus "cold" characteristics, can influence how subsequent traits are interpreted and ultimately the type of impression formed. Information inconsistent with a person's global impression of another individual is especially prominent in memory. The process of assimilation can lead to causal attributions of personality as this inconsistent information is integrated into the whole. This effect is especially influential when the behavior is perceived as negative. Consistent with negativity bias, negative behaviors are seen as more indicative of an individual's behavior in situations involving moral issues. Extreme negative behavior is also considered more predictive of personality traits than less extreme behavior.

History

Classic experiments
In a classic experiment, Solomon Asch's principal theoretical concern revolved around understanding the mechanisms influencing a person's overall impression of others, principally trait centrality and trait valence of various personality characteristics. His research illustrated the influential roles of the primacy effect, valence, and causal attribution on the part of the individual. Based on the findings of ten experiments studying the effect of various personality adjectives on the resulting quality and character of impressions, several key principles of impression formation have been identified:
 Individuals have a natural inclination to make global dispositional inferences about the nature of another person's personality.
 Individuals expect observed behaviors to reflect stable personality traits.
 Individuals attempt to fit information about different traits and behaviors into a meaningful and coherent whole.
 Individuals attempt to explain and rationalize inconsistencies when the available information does not fit with the global perception.

Theoretical development
In psychology Fritz Heider's writings on balance theory emphasized that liking or disliking a person depends on how the person is positively or negatively linked to other liked or disliked entities. Heider's later essay on social cognition, along with the development of "psycho-logic" by Robert P. Abelson and Milton J. Rosenberg, embedded evaluative processes in verbal descriptions of actions, with the verb of a descriptive sentence establishing the kind of linkage existing between the actor and object of the sentence. Harry Gollob expanded these insights with his subject-verb-object approach to social cognition, and he showed that evaluations of sentence subjects could be calculated with high precision from out-of-context evaluations of the subject, verb, and object, with part of the evaluative outcome coming from multiplicative interactions among the input evaluations. In a later work, Gollob and Betty Rossman extended the framework to predicting an actor's power and influence. Reid Hastie wrote that "Gollob's extension of the balance model to inferences concerning subject-verb-object sentences is the most important methodological and theoretical development of Heider's principle since its original statement."

Gollob's regression equations for predicting impressions of sentence subjects consisted of weighted summations of out-of-context ratings of the subject, verb, and object, and of multiplicative interactions of the ratings. The equations essentially supported the cognitive algebra approach of Norman H. Anderson's Information integration theory. Anderson, however, initiated a heated technical exchange between himself and Gollob, in which Anderson argued that Gollob's use of the general linear model led to indeterminate theory because it could not completely account for any particular case in the set of cases used to estimate the models. The recondite exchange typified a continuing debate between proponents of contextualism who argue that impressions result from situationally specific influences (e.g., from semantics and nonverbal communication as well as affective factors), and modelers who follow the pragmatic maxim, seeking approximations revealing core mental processes. Another issue in using least-squares estimations is the compounding of measurement error problems with multiplicative variables.

In sociology David R. Heise relabeled Gollob's framework from subject-verb-object to actor-behavior-object in order to allow for impression formation from perceived events as well as from verbal stimuli, and showed that actions produce impressions of behaviors and objects as well as of actors on all three dimensions of Charles E. Osgood's semantic differential—Evaluation, Potency, and Activity. Heise used equations describing impression-formation processes as the empirical basis for his cybernetic theory of action, Affect control theory.

Erving Goffman's book The Presentation of Self in Everyday Life and his essay "On Face-work" in the book Interaction Ritual focused on how individuals engage in impression management. Using the notion of face as identity is used now, Goffman proposed that individuals maintain face expressively. "By entering a situation in which he is given a face to maintain, a person takes on the responsibility of standing guard over the flow of events as they pass before him. He must ensure that a particular expressive order is sustained-an order that regulates the flow of events, large or small, so that anything that appears to be expressed by them will be consistent with his face." In other words, individuals control events so as to create desired impressions of themselves. Goffman emphasized that individuals in a group operate as a team with everyone committed to helping others maintain their identities.

Impression-formation processes in the US
Ratings of 515 action descriptions by American respondents yielded estimations of a statistical model consisting of nine impression-formation equations, predicting outcome Evaluation, Potency, and Activity of actor, behavior, and object from pre-event ratings of the evaluation, potency, and activity of actor, behavior, and object. The results were reported as maximum-likelihood estimations.

Stability was a factor in every equation, with some pre-action feeling toward an action element transferred to post-action feeling about the same element. Evaluation, Potency, and Activity of behaviors suffused to actors so impressions of actors were determined in part by the behaviors they performed. In general objects of action lost Potency.

Interactions among variables included consistency effects, such as receiving Evaluative credit for performing a bad behavior toward a bad object person, and congruency effects, such as receiving evaluative credit for nice behaviors toward weak objects or bad behaviors toward powerful objects. Third-order interactions included a balance effect in which actors received a boost in evaluation if two or none of the elements in the action were negative, otherwise a decrement. Across all nine prediction equations, more than half of the 64 possible predictors (first-order variables plus second- and third-order interactions) contributed to outcomes.

Studies of event descriptions that explicitly specified behavior settings found that impression-formation processes are largely the same when settings are salient, but the setting becomes an additional contributor to impression formation regarding actor, behavior, and object; and the action changes the impression of the setting.

Actor and object are the same person in self-directed actions such as "the lawyer praised himself" or various kinds of self-harm. Impression-formation research indicates that self-directed actions reduce the positivity of actors on the Evaluation, Potency, and Activity dimensions. Self-directed actions therefore are not an optimal way to confirm the good, potent, lively identities that people normally want to maintain. Rather self-directed actions are a likely mode of expression for individuals who want to manifest their low self-esteem and self-efficacy.

Early work on impression formation used action sentences like, "The kind man praises communists," and "Bill helped the corrupt senator," assuming that modifier-noun combinations amalgamate into a functional unit. A later study found that a modifier-noun combination does form an overall impression that works in action descriptions like a noun alone. The action sentences in that study combined identities with status characteristics, traits, moods, and emotions. Another study in 1989 focused specifically on emotion descriptors combined with identities (e.g., an angry child) and again found that emotion terms amalgamate with identities, and equations describing this kind of amalgamation are of the same form as equations describing trait-identity amalgamation.

Cross-cultural studies
Studies of various kinds of impression formation have been conducted in Canada, Japan, and Germany. Core processes are similar cross-culturally. For example, in every culture that has been studied, Evaluation of an actor was determined by-among other things-a stability effect, a suffusion from the behavior Evaluation, and an interaction that rewarded an actor for performing a behavior whose Evaluation was consistent with the Evaluation of the object person.

On the other hand, each culture weighted the core effects distinctively. For example, the impact of behavior-object Evaluation consistency was much smaller in Germany than in the United States, Canada, or Japan, suggesting that moral judgments of actors have a somewhat different basis in Germany than in the other cultures. Additionally, impression-formation processes involved some unique interactions in each culture. For example, attribute-identity amalgamations in Germany involved some Potency and Activity interactions that did not appear in other cultures.

The 2010 book Surveying Cultures reviewed cross-cultural research on impression-formation processes, and provided guidelines for conducting impression-formation studies in cultures where the processes are unexplored currently.

Recent studies 
Impression formation is based on the characteristics of both the perceivers and targets. However, research has not been able to quantify the extent to which these two groups contribute to impression. The research was conducted to determine the extent of how impressions originate from ‘our mind’ and ‘target face’. Results demonstrated that perceiver characteristics contribute more than target appearance. Impressions can be made from facial appearance alone and assessments on attributes such as nice, strong, and smart based on variations of the targets’ face. The results show that subtle facial traits have meaningful consequences on impressions, which is true even for young children of 3 years old. Studies have been conducted to study impression formation in social situations rather than situations involving threat. Research reveals that social goals can drive the formation of impressions and that there is flexibility in the possible impressions formed on target faces.

See also
 First impression (psychology)

Notes

References

Interpersonal relationships